Destino Imortal (Immortal Destiny) is a Portuguese, six-episode mini-series whose plot unfolds in a vampire universe. Broadcast by TVI, the miniseries debuted January 24, 2010. The miniseries was written by Artur Ribeiro, and directed by António Borges Correia, José Manuel Fernandes and Artur Ribeiro.

Plot summary
Miguel (Pedro Barroso) and his mother suffer a car accident; Miguel's mother dies, but the boy miraculously survives without any injuries. Given that his father died before he was born, he goes on to live with his grandmother in Sintra. There he is reunited with Carlos (Pedro Caeiro), his best childhood friend. Miguel asks for a transfer to the local university in Sintra and pursues a degree in history. On the first day of lectures, before entering the Medieval History classroom, Miguel watches someone approach. A girl walks in his direction, and as she enters their eyes immediately meet. Her name is Sofia (Catarina Wallenstein). Miguel and Sofia immediately feel an explosive and overwhelming attraction. The presence of Sofia will also awaken unknown abilities in Miguel, both physically and mentally.

Though Miguel and Sofia do not know it, their destinies are connected. Sofia is a vampire that belongs to the family of Hector (Rogério Samora), Lídia (Maria João Luís), and the provocative Valentina (Evelina Pereira). Sofia is not a mere vampire; she is the next step in vampiric evolution, because she is immune to sunlight. Therefore, she is protected by Hector and Lídia, envied by Valentina and coveted by Hector's creator, the deadly Victor (Jorge Corrula). Like Sofia, Miguel is not a mere human. The first episode suggests that he may be the son of the vampire Charles, which makes him a dhampir and, consequently, gives him powers against the vampires. This is explained by the fact that damphyrs inherit the powers of vampires, but none of their weaknesses.

Main cast

Pedro Barroso - Miguel Nabuco
Catarina Wallenstein - Sofia Wagner
Pedro Caeiro - Carlos (character)
Jorge Corrula - Victor (character)
Filipe Crawford - Professor Lopes
Maria d'Aires - Julieta (personagem)
Duarte Gomes - Gonçalo (character)
Catarina Gouveia - Carolina (character)
Eurico Lopes - Faustino (character)
Maria João Luís - Lídia (character)
Gracinda Nave - Professora Regina
Evelina Pereira - Valentina (character)
Rogério Samora - Hector Bettencourt
Rodrigo Saraiva - Luís (character)
Jorge Silva - Comandante Hilário
Amélia Videira - Antónia (character)

Additional cast

Francisco Macau - Viegas
Simão Biernat - João (character) 
Joana Palet - Filipa (character)
Emanuel Arada - Lúcio Loureiro
Pedro Rodil - Tosso
Filipe Leroux - Inspector Tiago Varte
Wagner Borges (ator) -
José Neto - Inspector Samuel Martins

Episodes

 1 e 2: 24 January 2010
 3 e 4: 31 January 2010
 5 e 6: 7 February 2010

See also
Vampire film
List of vampire television series

2010 Portuguese television series debuts
2010 Portuguese television series endings
Vampires in television
2010s Portuguese television series